HD 117207 is a star in the southern constellation Centaurus. With an apparent visual magnitude of 7.24, it is too dim to be visible to the naked eye but can be seen with a small telescope. Based upon parallax measurements, it is located at a distance of 105.6 light years from the Sun. The star is drifting closer with a radial velocity of −17.4 km/s. It has an absolute magnitude of 4.67.

This object has a stellar classification of G7IV-V, showing blended spectral traits of a G-type main-sequence star and an older, evolving subgiant star. It is around four billion years old with 5% greate mass than the Sun and a 7% larger radius. The star is radiating 1.16 times the luminosity of the Sun from its photosphere at an effective temperature of 5,644 K.

In 2005, a planet was found orbiting the star using the radial velocity method, and was designated HD 117207 b. The minimum mass of this object is nearly double that of Jupiter.

See also 
 HD 117618
 List of extrasolar planets

References

G-type main-sequence stars
Planetary systems with one confirmed planet
Centaurus (constellation)
Durchmusterung objects
117207
065808